Mariella Ahrens (born 2 April 1969) is a Russian-born German actress.

Early life 
Ahrens was born in Leningrad (Saint Petersburg) as the daughter of a German computer specialist and a Bulgarian ophthalmologist. She grew up to the age of three in Bulgaria and then moved in 1974 to Berlin-Friedrichshain in East Germany.

Education 
After a previous cancellation by the Ernst Busch Academy of Dramatic Arts, she completed her education as an actress at Fritz-Kirchhoff-Schule in Berlin.

Career 
Ahrens first appeared on stage at the Kleine Theater in "Palais Podewils" in Berlin.

In addition to roles in television series such as Leipzig Homicide, Sabine! and Im Namen des Gesetzes, she also played in the ZDF production The Desert Rose as well as Dreamtime and Rosamunde Pilcher films.

Ahrens was photographed for the March issue of 2001 and as a cover girl for the March 2004 issue of the German Playboy magazine.

In 2004 she was a participant in "Ich bin ein Star - Holt mich hier raus!.

In 2015 she played Walpurga von Schwarztal in the television movie Prinzessin Maleen.

Filmography

Film 
 1987 Jan Oppen - Motorradbraut.
 2015: Prinzessin Maleen

Television series 
 1995 Balko - Sandra. 'Hotline' episode.

Personal life 
In 1999, Ahrens gave birth to her daughter Isabella Maria in a relationship with Croatian derivative trader Dragan Banić. In 2001, Ahrens married investment banker Jost Paffrath. One year later, they separated, and divorced in 2004.

On 12 December 2006, Ahrens married Patrick Graf von Faber-Castell in a civil ceremony in New York City, New York. Although she has since been called "Countess von Faber-Castell", she continues to call herself Ahrens. The couple met each other at the wedding of Verona and Franjo Pooth in Vienna in September 2005 and was engaged since September 2006. The church wedding took place on 7 July 2007 at the Martin Luther Church in Stein at Nuremberg. Ahrens' daughter was adopted by Patrick Graf von Faber-Castell. Their daughter Lucia was born in March 2007. On 5 November 2012, the couple announced their split "due to different views of life".

References

External links 
 

1969 births
Living people
Actresses from Saint Petersburg
German film actresses
German stage actresses
German television actresses
20th-century German actresses
21st-century German actresses
Ich bin ein Star – Holt mich hier raus! participants
German people of Bulgarian descent